Man on Horseback is a 1969 West German drama film directed by Volker Schlöndorff based on the novel Michael Kohlhaas by Heinrich von Kleist. It was entered into the 1969 Cannes Film Festival. Another film based on the book was released at the 2013 Cannes Film Festival.

Cast

See also
 The Jack Bull (1999)
 Age of Uprising: The Legend of Michael Kohlhaas (2013)

References

External links

1969 films
1969 drama films
1960s historical drama films
West German films
English-language German films
1960s German-language films
Films based on German novels
Films based on works by Heinrich von Kleist
Films directed by Volker Schlöndorff
Films produced by Rob Houwer
Films scored by Stanley Myers
Films set in Prussia
Films set in the Holy Roman Empire
Films set in the 16th century
Films about rebellions
Cultural depictions of Martin Luther
Columbia Pictures films
German historical drama films
1960s German films